The Order of Science and Technology Merit (Hanja: 科學技術勳章 과학기술훈장) is one of the Republic of Korea's (South Korea) Orders of Merit. It is awarded to those who have rendered outstanding meritorious services in the interest of improving the science and technology.

This Order is mostly newly organized order of the Republic of Korea. Before that order was established, Order of Industrial Service Merit had been bestowed to scientists and technologists.

Classes of Science and Technology Merit
The Order of  Science and Technology Merit is conferred in five classes: 
  Changjo (Creation) 창조장 
  Hyeoksin (Reformation) 혁신장 
  Ungbi (Great Achievement) 웅비장 
  Doyak (Leap) 도약장 
  Jinbo (Progress) 진보장

Other Orders of Merit
There are three kinds of decoration awarded by the Republic of Korea. They are Orders, Medals of Merit, and Service Medals.

References

External links
 과학기술훈장(科學技術勳章, Order of Science and Technology Merit</u>.
 Republic of Korea's Orders of Merit

Orders, decorations, and medals of South Korea